Demogorgon is an artificial pagan god or demon invented by Christian scholars, possibly as the result of a transcription error.

Demogorgon may also refer to:

 Demogorgon (Dungeons & Dragons), a demon prince in the Dungeons & Dragons role-playing game
 Demogorgon (Stranger Things), a fictional monster named after but not especially similar to the Dungeons and Dragons demon 
 Demogorgon, a horror novel by Brian Lumley
 Demogorgon, an invalid genus name used for earwigs presently in the genus Labidura